Serra Sant'Abbondio is a comune (municipality) in the Province of Pesaro e Urbino in the Italian region Marche, located about  west of Ancona and about  south of Pesaro.

It is the home of the historic hermitage of Fonte Avellana.

References

Cities and towns in the Marche